Sai Spurthi Institute of Technology (SSIT) is an engineering college located in Sathupally, Khammam district, Telangana, India. The college was affiliated to Jawaharlal Nehru Technological University, Hyderabad and accredited by the National Assessment and Accreditation Council.

History
The Sai Spurthi Institute of Technology was established in 2001, by the Vipassana Educational Trust, Hyderabad. The chairman of the college is Dr. B. Partha Sarathi Reddy, the CMD of Hetero Drugs, and the secretary is Sri M.V. Krishna Reddy. The motive behind establishing the college was to impart quality technical education to the rural people and to uplift the talent of economically backward students to greater levels.

Academics
The courses in the undergraduate programme being offered by SSIT presently are computer systems engineering, electrical and electronics (EEE), electronics and communication, mechanical engineering, mining engineering and agricultural engineering. The EEE department technical association provides opportunities to students to give weekly seminars on current topics of interest, and also arranges guest lectures. The association conducts competitions in technical paper presentations, working models exhibition, technical quiz, and gives awards and prizes.

In the post graduation programme, Master of Business Administration is being offered. In the diploma programme, courses in electrical and electronics, electronics and communication, mechanical engineering are being offered.

Amenities
Both academic and residential infrastructure and facilities are located on a 26-acre area.

The SSIT library system consists of a central library with 6 departmental sections. All students, faculty members and employees of SSIT are entitled to make use of library facilities upon obtaining library membership. The library has a digital library with a collection of books for engineering, science, management and humanities. The campus has an internet facility that can be accessed through both LAN and WIFI, as well as e-classrooms provided to teach students with web enhanced learning.

The campus also has sports and game facilities, where activities such as volleyball, basketball, cricket, shuttle and ball badminton can be played. Bus transportation is provided to students so that students from all parts of the town can easily access the college.

External links
Official website 
Indiastudy Channel column
 youth4work portal

Engineering colleges in Telangana
Educational institutions established in 2001
2001 establishments in Andhra Pradesh